The Mad Hatter is a character in Lewis Carroll's stories.

Mad Hatter may refer to:

Arts and entertainment

Fictional characters
 Mad Hatter (DC Comics), DC Comics character
 Mad Hatter, a Marvel Comics character associated with villain White Rabbit
 Mad Hatter, a character in Once Upon a Time

Film
 The Mad Hatter (1948 film), a 1948 Woody Woodpecker animated cartoon
 The Mad Hatters a 1935 British comedy film
 Breakfast in Hollywood, also known as The Mad Hatter, a 1946 American comedy film

Music
 The Mad Hatter (album), by Chick Corea, 1978
 Mad Hatter (album), by Bonham, 1992, and the album's title track
 The Madhatter, an EP by Bigelf, 2003
 "Mad Hatter", a song by The Stranglers from Aural Sculpture, 1984
 "Mad Hatter", a song by Lynyrd Skynyrd from Vicious Cycle, 2003
 "Mad Hatter", a song by Melanie Martinez from Cry Baby, 2015
 "Mad Hatter" (Avenged Sevenfold song), 2018
 "The Mad Hatter", a song by Cast from Mother Nature Calls, 1997

People with the nickname
 Mad Hatter (bank robber) (James Madison, born 1956/57)
 Albert Anastasia (1902–1957), American gangster 
 James Larratt Battersby (1907–1955), British fascist and pacifist
 Todd Burns (born 1963), American baseball player
 Don Ebert (born 1959), American soccer player 
 Clyde Hatter (1908–1937), American baseball player
 Les Miles (born 1953), American football coach
 Gregory Scarpa (1928–1994), American capo and hitman 
 Leon Wilkeson (1952–2001), musician with Lynyrd Skynyrd

Other uses
 Mad Hatter (horse) (born 1916), an American Thoroughbred horse
 MadHatters, an a cappella group at the University of Wisconsin–Madison
 Mad hatter disease, or erethism, an occupational disease among hatmakers
 Danbury Mad Hatters, an American ice hockey team
 492nd Fighter Squadron, U.S. Air Force, nicknamed The Madhatters

See also
 
 Mad as a hatter (disambiguation)
 Hatter (disambiguation)
The Hatter (Alice's Adventures in Wonderland)
 The Mad Hatter Mystery, a 1933 detective story by John Dickson Carr
 V. R. Parton, chess variant inventor, inspired by the works of Lewis Carroll
 Chapelier Fou, a French electronic musician whose stage name is the French translation of Mad Hatter